The 2022 Colombian Women's Football League (officially known as the Liga Femenina BetPlay DIMAYOR 2022 for sponsorship purposes) was the sixth season of Colombia's women's football league. The season started on 18 February and ended on 5 June 2022.

América de Cali won their second title in the competition, defeating the defending champions Deportivo Cali in the finals by a 4–3 aggregate score.

Format
On 13 January 2022, the División Mayor del Fútbol Profesional Colombiano (DIMAYOR) confirmed the format for the 2022 Liga Femenina season, following a meeting of its Board of Competition. For this season the league had 17 teams competing as well as a change of format for the first stage, which was played as a single round-robin tournament with all teams playing each other once and having a bye day, instead of the group stage used in previous editions of the tournament. The top eight teams at the end of the first stage advanced to the quarter-finals, with the winners advancing to the semi-finals. The winners of each semi-final advanced to the finals to decide the champions. All rounds in the knockout stage were played on a home-and-away, double-legged basis. The champions and runners-up qualified for the 2022 Copa Libertadores Femenina.

On 5 June 2022, prior to the second leg of the Liga Femenina finals between América de Cali and Deportivo Cali, DIMAYOR and the Ministry of Sports of Colombia announced that a second tournament would be held in the second semester of 2022 after the latter announced an additional investment of 1.2 billion COP to the tournament. The Torneo II was expected to begin in August and end in October, prior to the start of the Copa Libertadores Femenina, however, on 7 July 2022 DIMAYOR announced that the second tournament had been cancelled given that only seven teams had confirmed their participation.

Teams
17 DIMAYOR affiliate clubs took part in the competition with their women's teams. No teams from the previous season withdrew, whilst Junior, Deportes Tolima, Deportivo Pereira, Orsomarso and former champions Atlético Huila returned to the competition for this season. Cortuluá, who withdrew from the previous season due to financial reasons, also fielded a team for this season.

Stadia and locations

First stage
The first stage started on 20 February and consisted of a single-round robin tournament with the 17 participating teams playing each other once. It ended on 9 May with the top eight teams advancing to the knockout stage.

Standings

Results

Knockout stage

Bracket

Quarter-finals

|}

First leg

Second leg

Semi-finals

|}

First leg

Second leg

Finals

América de Cali won 4–3 on aggregate.

Top scorers

Source: Soccerway

See also
 Colombian Women's Football League

References

External links 
 Liga Femenina on Dimayor's official website 

Col
W
2022